Joshua Luke Bowler (born 5 March 1999) is an English professional footballer who plays as a right winger for EFL Championship club Blackpool, on loan from Premier League club Nottingham Forest. He has previously played for Blackpool, Queens Park Rangers, Everton and Hull City.

Club career

Queens Park Rangers
After being released by Fulham, Bowler spent two years at the newly established Aldershot FC Academy before its closure in 2013. Bowler then joined the Queens Park Rangers youth team in 2013, becoming a full professional in March 2017. In May that year, he made his first-team debut in the last game of the 2016–17 EFL Championship season against Norwich City.

Everton
On 7 July 2017, Bowler joined Everton on a three-year deal.

Hull City (loan)
On 18 July 2019, Bowler signed a one-year contract extension with Everton and joined  club Hull City on loan for the 2019–20 season.
Bowler made his first appearance for the club in the opening match of the 2019–20 season, a 2–1 defeat at Swansea City, when he came off the bench to replace Kamil Grosicki. On 1 June 2020, Hull indicated the loan would be extended to the end of the 2019–20 season.

Blackpool
On 19 June 2021, Bowler agreed to sign for Blackpool in a one-year deal that was confirmed on 1 July. The club has an option to extend his contract by a further year, which they exercised at the end of the 2021–22 season.

Nottingham Forest
On 1 September 2022, Bowler signed with Premier League side Nottingham Forest and was immediately loaned to Greek Super League club Olympiacos for the remainder of the season. After struggling for minutes in Greece, Bowler was recalled by Forest on 5 January 2023, and immediately loaned to his previous club Blackpool.

Career statistics

Honours 
Everton U23s

 Premier League Cup: 2018–19

References

External links
Josh Bowler – Soccerbase

1999 births
Living people
Sportspeople from Chertsey
English footballers
Association football wingers
Everton F.C. players
Queens Park Rangers F.C. players
Hull City A.F.C. players
Blackpool F.C. players
Premier League players
English Football League players
Super League Greece players
Nottingham Forest F.C. players
Olympiacos F.C. players
English expatriate footballers
English expatriate sportspeople in Greece
Expatriate footballers in Greece